William Fred Birch (August 30, 1870, Newark, New Jersey – January 25, 1946, Glen Ridge, New Jersey) was an American politician and businessman who represented New Jersey's 5th congressional district in the United States House of Representatives from 1918 to 1919.

Early life and education 
Birch was born in Newark, New Jersey on August 30, 1870. He moved with his parents to Phillipsburg, New Jersey, in 1872 and to Dover, New Jersey, in 1874. He attended the public schools and was graduated from the New Jersey State Model School at Trenton and from Coleman’s Business College at Newark in 1887.

Career 
He engaged in the manufacture of boilers and smokestacks at Dover. Birch was a member of the Dover Common Council for several years and city recorder from 1904 to 1909. He served as a member of the New Jersey General Assembly from 1910 to 1912.

Birch was elected as a Republican to the Sixty-fifth Congress to fill the vacancy caused by the death of John H. Capstick and served from November 5, 1918, to March 3, 1919, but was not a candidate for renomination in 1918.

After leaving Congress, he resumed his former manufacturing pursuits; also engaged in the fire-insurance and automobile businesses and was interested in banking. He retired from business activities in 1941.

Death 
Birch died in Glen Ridge, New Jersey on January 25, 1946, and was interred in Orchard Street Cemetery in Dover.

References
 
William Fred Birch at The Political Graveyard

1870 births
1946 deaths
Republican Party members of the New Jersey General Assembly
People from Dover, New Jersey
People from Phillipsburg, New Jersey
Republican Party members of the United States House of Representatives from New Jersey